El árbol azul ("The Blue Tree") is an Argentinian children's telenovela, originally broadcast in 1991–1992  on Canal 13.

Cast 
Guido Kaczka as Daniel "Danny" Figueroa.
Belén Blanco as Luciana Fernandez
Paula D'Amico as Valeria Cardone.
Facundo Espinosa as Federico "Fede".
Eugenia Talice as Mariana.
Mauro Martín as Miguel.
Carlos Pedevilla as Francisco "Pancho" Fernández.
Desiree Nagüel as María.
Guillermo Santa Cruz as Guille.
Paula Montel as Flor.
Maximiliano Greco as Rafael.
Matías Puelles as José.
Natalia Perez as Verónica.
Diego Bozzolo as Matías.
Elvira Vicario as ?
Horacio Dener as Don Juan.
Andrés Vicente as Andrés Fernández.
Morena Druchas as Morena Figueroa.
Noelia Alegna as Ani.
Pablo Albino as Tony.
Martín Galigniana as Jorge.
Victoria Onetto as Señorita Angélica.
Monica Gonzaga as Mónica de Cardone.
Antonio Caride as Roberto Cardone.
Marzenka Novak as Carmen.
Ana María Caso as Delia de Figueroa.
Raquel Albeniz as Teresa.
Carlos Muñoz as Don Sebastián.
Dora Baret as Teresa Visconti.
Roberto Antier as Daniel Ferrero.
Gustavo Bermúdez as Franco Ferrero.
Andrea Del Boca as Celeste Verardi.
Michelle Diehl - Michelle Gutiérrez.
Sandra Dipp as Laura.
Cristina Fernández as Mathilda.
 as Domenico Colacci.
Mónica Galán as Antonia.
Adela Gleijer as Aída Ferrero.
Roberto Gonzalo as Ramón Tacone.
Diego Greco as Tomás.
Estela Kiesling as Magdalena.
Carlos Larrache as Fernando Gutiérrez.
Anahí Martella as Esther Tacone.
Germán Palacios as Enzo Ferrero.
Josefina Ríos as ?
Abel Sáenz Buhr as Manuel.
Susana Sisto as ?
Juan Carlos Ucello as ?
Beatriz Vives as Andrea.

Adaptations 
In 1998 the Mexican TV production company Televisa released its own adaptation of the telenovela. It was titled Una luz en el camino and starred Mariana Botas, Veronica Merchant, and Guillermo Capetillo.

References

External links 
 

Television shows set in Argentina
1990s Argentine television series
1991 telenovelas
1992 telenovelas
1991 Argentine television series debuts
1992 Argentine television series endings
Argentine children's television series
El Trece